The Diosphos Painter was an Athenian Attic black-figure vase painter thought to have been active from 500–475 BCE, many of whose surviving works are on lekythoi.  

The Diosphos Painter was a pupil of the Edinburgh Painter, who also trained the Sappho Painter. He was first identified by C.H.E. Haspels in her Attic Black-figure Lekythoi (Paris, 1936).

See also
 List of Greek vase painters

External links
 Works by the Diosphos Painter at the Metropolitan Museum of Art

Ancient Greek vase painters
Archaic Greek art